RusHydro (previous name: Hydro-OGK) is a Russian hydroelectricity company. As of early 2012 it had a capacity of 34.9 gigawatts. In late 2009, it was the world's second-largest hydroelectric power producer and is the country's largest power-generating company and the largest successor to RAO UES. The conglomerate, which is partly government-owned, underwent a major consolidation beginning in July 2007.  , the head of the company was Evgeny Dod. Its head office is in Obruchevsky District, South-Western Administrative Okrug, Moscow.

Major power plants

Bureya Dam
Volga Hydroelectric Station
Votkinsk Hydroelectric Station
Dagestan Branch
Zhiguli Hydroelectric Station
Zagorskaya PSHPP
Zeya Dam
Irganayskaya HPP
Kabardino-Balkarian Branch
Kamskaya HPP
Karachaevo-Cherkessian Branch
Cascade of Verkhnevolzhskiye HPPs
Cascade of Kubanskiye HPPs
Nizhegorodskaya HPP
Novosibirskaya HPP
Saratov Hydroelectric Station
Boguchany Dam
Sayano-Shushenskaya Dam
Northern Ossetian Branch
Cheboksary Dam

Performance indicators

Sanctions
On 24 February 2022, in response to Russia's invasion of Ukraine, US President Joe Biden announced sanctions against several Russian individuals, entities and financial institutions, including RusHydro.

See also 

 Kislaya Guba Tidal Power Station
 2009 Sayano-Shushenskaya hydro accident

References

External links
 Official site
 Official site 
 RusHydro completes consolidation, '07 results jump International Water Power and Dam Construction 10 July 2008
 Big blue A clean-power colossus hopes to grow even bigger 24 July 2008 The Economist print edition

 
Electric power companies of Russia
Hydroelectricity in Russia
Hydroelectric power companies of Russia
Energy companies established in 2004
Renewable resource companies established in 2004
Companies listed on the Moscow Exchange
Government-owned companies of Russia
Companies based in Moscow
Russian brands
Russian companies established in 2004
Russian entities subject to the U.S. Department of the Treasury sanctions